The 13015 / 13016 Howrah – Jamalpur Junction Kavi Guru Express is an Express train of the Kavi Guru series belonging to Indian Railways – Eastern Railway zone that runs between  and  in India.

It operates as train number 13015 from Howrah Junction to Jamalpur and as train number 13016 in the reverse direction, serving the state of West Bengal, Jharkhand & Bihar.

Coaches

The 13015 / 13016 Howrah–Bhagalpur Junction Kavi Guru Express has 1 AC chair car, 3 2nd seating chair car 8 General Unreserved & 2 SLR (Seating cum Luggage Rake) coaches. It does not carry a pantry car .

As is customary with most train services in India, coach composition may be amended at the discretion of Indian Railways depending on demand.

Service

As the average speed of the train is below , as per Indian Railways rules, its fare does include a Superfast surcharge.

Routeing

Traction

A Howrah-based WDM-3D / WDM-3A / WDP-4D locomotives hauls the train for its entire journey.

Operation

 13015 Howrah–Bhagalpur Junction Kavi Guru Express runs from Howrah on a daily basis reaching Bhagalpur Junction the same day.
 13016 Bhagalpur Junction–Howrah Kavi Guru Express runs from Bhagalpur Junction on a daily basis reaching Howrah the same day.

See also

 Kavi Guru Express
 12949/50 Porbandar–Santragachi Kavi Guru Express
 13027/28 Howrah–Azimganj Kavi Guru Express
 19709/10 Udaipur City–Kamakhya Kavi Guru Express

References 

 http://media2.intoday.in/businesstoday/images/RailBudget_2011-12.pdf
 http://www.kolkatabengalinfo.com/2011/11/howrah-bolpur-kavi-guru-express-train.html
 https://www.youtube.com/watch?v=E9Vb-pxS3rc
 http://www.thehindu.com/news/national/special-trains-to-commemorate-rabindranath-tagore-swami-vivekananda-birth-anniversaries/article1489454.ece

External links

Rail transport in Howrah
Railway services introduced in 2011
Kavi Guru Express trains
Rail transport in West Bengal